William G. F. Botzow II (born 29 September 1945, in New York City) is a visual artist and politician.

Botzow graduated with an A.B. in art and archaeology from Princeton University in 1968 after completing an 89-page long senior thesis titled "Spatial Inquiries." He has been a resident of Pownal, Vermont since 1 January 1982.

Botzow was elected to Vermont's state House of Representatives in 2002 as a Democrat, and he continues to serve in that position as the elected member for the Bennington-1 Representative District.

References

Living people
1945 births
Politicians from New York City
Democratic Party members of the Vermont House of Representatives
Artists from Vermont
Princeton University alumni
21st-century American politicians